Waldemar Bogdan Wiązowski (born 25 December 1944 in Pionki) is a Polish politician. He was elected to the Sejm on 25 September 2005, getting 9751 votes in 2 Wałbrzych district as a candidate from the Law and Justice list.

He was also a member of Sejm 1997-2001.

See also
Members of Polish Sejm 2005-2007

External links
Waldemar Wiązowski - parliamentary page - includes declarations of interest, voting record, and transcripts of speeches.

1944 births
Living people
People from Radom County
Members of the Polish Sejm 2005–2007
Members of the Polish Sejm 1997–2001
Law and Justice politicians
Members of the Polish Sejm 2007–2011